Trichoniscus is a genus of woodlice. It contains over 100 species, including the common pygmy woodlouse, Trichoniscus pusillus:

Trichoniscus aenariensis Verhoeff, 1942
Trichoniscus alemannicus Verhoeff, 1917
Trichoniscus alexandrae Caruso, 1978
Trichoniscus alticola Legrand, Strouhal & Vandel, 1950
Trichoniscus anophthalmus Vandel, 1965
Trichoniscus apenninicus Taiti & Ferrara, 1995
Trichoniscus aphonicus Borutzky, 1977
Trichoniscus asper Menge, 1854
Trichoniscus baschierii Brian, 1953
Trichoniscus bassoti Vandel, 1960
Trichoniscus beroni Andreev, 1985
Trichoniscus beschkovi Andreev, 1986
Trichoniscus biformatus Racovitza, 1908
Trichoniscus bogovinae Pljakić, 1970
Trichoniscus bononiensis Vandel, 1965
Trichoniscus bosniensis Verhoeff, 1901
Trichoniscus bulgaricus Andreev, 1970
Trichoniscus bureschi Verhoeff, 1926
Trichoniscus buturovici Pljakić, 1972
Trichoniscus callorii Brian, 1954
Trichoniscus carniolicus Strouhal, 1939
Trichoniscus carpaticus Tabacaru, 1974
Trichoniscus castanearum Verhoeff, 1952
Trichoniscus cavernicola Vandel, 1958
Trichoniscus chasmatophilus Strouhal, 1936
Trichoniscus circuliger Verhoeff, 1931
Trichoniscus coiffaiti Vandel, 1955
Trichoniscus corcyraeus Verhoeff, 1901
Trichoniscus crassipes Verhoeff, 1939
Trichoniscus craterium Verhoeff, 1942
Trichoniscus dancaui Tabacaru, 1996
Trichoniscus darwini Vandel, 1938
Trichoniscus demivirgo Blake, 1931
Trichoniscus dragani Tabacaru, 1974
Trichoniscus epomeanus Verhoeff, 1942
Trichoniscus foveolatus Vandel, 1950
Trichoniscus fragilis Racovitza, 1908
Trichoniscus gachassini (Giard, 1899)
Trichoniscus garevi Andreev, 2000
Trichoniscus ghidinii Brian, 1931
Trichoniscus gordoni Vandel, 1955
Trichoniscus gudauticus Borutzky, 1977
Trichoniscus halophilus Vandel, 1951
Trichoniscus heracleotis Strouhal, 1971
Trichoniscus heroldii Verhoeff, 1931
Trichoniscus hoctuni Mulaik, 1960
Trichoniscus illyricus Verhoeff, 1931
Trichoniscus inferus Verhoeff, 1908
Trichoniscus intermedius Vandel, 1958
Trichoniscus jeanneli Vandel, 1955
Trichoniscus karawankianus Verhoeff, 1939
Trichoniscus korsakovi Vandel, 1947
Trichoniscus lazzaronius Verhoeff, 1952
Trichoniscus licodrensis Pljakić, 1977
Trichoniscus lindbergi Vandel, 1958
Trichoniscus litorivagus Verhoeff, 1944
Trichoniscus maremmanus Taiti & Ferrara, 1995
Trichoniscus maritimus Verhoeff, 1930
Trichoniscus matulici Verhoeff, 1901
Trichoniscus muscivagus Verhoeff, 1917
Trichoniscus naissensis Pljakić, 1977
Trichoniscus neapolitanus Verhoeff, 1952
Trichoniscus nicaensis Legrand, 1953
Trichoniscus nivatus Verhoeff, 1917
Trichoniscus noricus Verhoeff, 1917
Trichoniscus oedipus Sfenthourakis, 1995
Trichoniscus orchidicola Mulaik, 1960
Trichoniscus pancici Pljakić, 1977
Trichoniscus pavani Brian, 1938
Trichoniscus pedronensis Vandel, 1947
Trichoniscus petrovi Andreev, 2002
Trichoniscus peyerimhoffi Vandel, 1955
Trichoniscus provisorius Racovitza, 1908
Trichoniscus pseudopusillus Arcangeli, 1929
Trichoniscus pusillus Brandt, 1833
Trichoniscus pygmaeus Sars, 1898
Trichoniscus racovitzai Tabacaru, 1994
Trichoniscus raitchevi Andreev & Tabacaru, 1972
Trichoniscus rhodiensis Arcangeli, 1934
Trichoniscus rhodopiensis Vandel, 1965
Trichoniscus riparianus Verhoeff, 1936
Trichoniscus scheerpeltzi Strouhal, 1958
Trichoniscus semigranulatus Buturović, 1954
Trichoniscus serbicus Pljakić, 1970
Trichoniscus serboorientalis Pljakić, 1977
Trichoniscus simplicifrons Verhoeff, 1901
Trichoniscus soloisensis Vandel, 1959
Trichoniscus stammeri Verhoeff, 1932
Trichoniscus steinboecki Verhoeff, 1931
Trichoniscus stoevi Andreev, 2002
Trichoniscus strasseri Verhoeff, 1938
Trichoniscus styricus Strouhal, 1958
Trichoniscus sulcatus Verhoeff, 1917
Trichoniscus tenebrarum Verhoeff, 1926
Trichoniscus thielei Verhoeff, 1901
Trichoniscus tranteevi Andreev, 2000
Trichoniscus tuberculatus Tabacaru, 1996
Trichoniscus valkanovi Andreev, 1985
Trichoniscus vandeli Tabacaru, 1996
Trichoniscus verhoeffi Dahl, 1919
Trichoniscus voltai Arcangeli, 1948
Trichoniscus vulcanius Verhoeff, 1942
Trichoniscus zangherii Arcangeli, 1952

References

Woodlice